Gary John Lupul (April 20, 1959 – July 18, 2007) was a Canadian professional ice hockey player who played for the Vancouver Canucks of the National Hockey League.

Playing career
Born and raised in Powell River, British Columbia, Lupul played his junior hockey career with the Nanaimo Clippers and the Victoria Cougars of the Western Hockey League.

He signed a free agent contract with the Canucks a day prior to the team opening their training camp in Powell River. Lupul, at 5-foot-9 in height and 175 pounds, immediately demonstrated his feistiness by fighting Gerry Minor in his first day at training camp.

Lupul, known as the Pride of Powell River, played seven seasons as a forward with the Canucks, from 1979 to 1986.  In 1982, he scored five points in 10 playoff games as Vancouver made it to the Stanley Cup finals for the first time.

Lupul had his best years in 1983 and 1984 playing on a line with Lars Molin and Dave "Tiger" Williams.

In 1984, Lupul was the first NHL player to fight Mario Lemieux and did so in Mario's home debut in his rookie season. Horribly overmatched by the much larger Lemieux, Lupul had to be rescued by goaltender John Garrett, who was then given a game misconduct for being the third player in the fight.

Post-playing career
Following retirement from professional hockey, Lupul was a junior and college scout for the Vancouver Canucks in Ontario. The Canucks first hired him to help Lupul address a substance abuse problem.

Lupul, who was known to have cardiovascular concerns, was found lifeless in his nephew's Burnaby condo.

Lupul was of Ukrainian descent.

Career statistics

Regular season and playoffs

International

References

External links

1959 births
2007 deaths
Berlin Capitals players
Brunico SG players
Canadian ice hockey forwards
Canadian people of Ukrainian descent
Dallas Black Hawks players
EHC Kloten players
Fredericton Express players
Ice hockey people from British Columbia
Nanaimo Clippers players
People from Powell River, British Columbia
Undrafted National Hockey League players
Vancouver Canucks players
Victoria Cougars (WHL) players